The Mitsubishi Z platform was a small-car platform jointly developed by DaimlerChrysler and Mitsubishi Motors since 2001 and used in the Mitsubishi Colt first introduced in 2003. It was also used a year later in the Smart Forfour, and was to have underpinned DaimlerChrysler's Smart Formore mini SUV until that project was discontinued.

The Mitsubishi Colt, which was built at the NedCar plant in Born, Netherlands, the Pininfarina carrozzeria in Turin, Italy and the Okazaki, Aichi plant in Japan, was the only "Z-car" in production which uses the platform.

Uses

Mitsubishi 

 Mitsubishi Colt (2004-2012)

Smart

Released 

 Smart Forfour (2004-2006)

Unreleased 

 Smart Formore

References

 "Mitsubishi Motors Corporation Announces Financial Results, Reports on Achievement of Major Milestones in Turnaround", Mitsubishi Motors press release, May 18, 2001
 Commission decision of 20 December 2001 on the State aid which Germany is planning to implement for DaimlerChrysler AG in Kölleda, Eur-Lex.Europa.eu, October 19, 2002
 "Forward Model Programmes, West European car manufacturers (part one)", Gareth Davies, World Automotive Manufacturing, Issue no.66, February 2004
 "Magical Mystery Tour - Rolf Eckrodt new Mitsubishi Motors Corp. chief operating officer", Katherine Zachary with Alisa Priddle, Ward's AutoWorld, February 1, 2002

Z